Stenaelurillus hirsutus is  a species of jumping spider in the genus Stenaelurillus that lives in Central Africa, Congo, Ghana,  Kenya, Senegal, Tanzania, and Uganda. It was first described in 1927 by Robert de Lessert. The male is distinguished by its black and white striped pattern on the anterior of the carapace and a mane of light-coloured hairs around the eye field that are reminiscent of a Mohawk hairstyle. The female's epigyne has a deep narrow pocket and bean-shaped copulatory openings. The clypeus has a distinctive pattern of three vertical white stripes on its otherwise black exterior.

Taxonomy
Stenaelurillus hirsutus was first described in 1927 by the Swiss arachnologist, Robert de Lessert. It was placed in the genus Stenaelurillus that was first raised by Eugène Simon in 1885. The name relates to the genus name Aelurillus, which itself derives from the Greek word for cat, with the addition of a Greek stem meaning narrow. The species name is the Latin word for hairy. In 2017, the genus was grouped with nine other genera of jumping spiders under the name Aelurillines.  It has been placed in the subtribe Aelurillina in the tribe Aelurillini in the clade Saltafresia.

Synonyms
Stenaelurillus cristatus, first identified by Wanda Wesołowska and Anthony Russell-Smith in 2000, is considered a synonym for Stenaelurillus hirsutus. The species name cristatus derives from the Latin word for crested.

Description
The spider is small. The male has a red-brown or dark brown carapace covered in scales, with bands of white scales crossing the back and thorax. It is described as both oval and pear-shaped. The chelicerae are brown and hairy. The eye field is black and has long dense fawn-coloured hairs that form a mane that produces an effect reminiscent of the Mohawk hairstyle popular in punk fashion. Similar hair form a brush around the carapace. The abdomen is dark brown with two narrow lines of white hairs at the front and three dots to the rear. The spinnerets are dark brown and the legs are brown-yellow. The pedipalps are yellow, and the palpal bulb is short. The embolus is short and straight.

The female is slightly larger than the male, typically  longer. The carapace is brown and has white scales covering two yellow stripes that stretch from front to back. The abdomen is dark brown with three pots and an indistinct leaf pattern marked in white on its back. The spinnerets are brown and legs yellow. The epigyne has a deep narrow pocket and widely separated bean-shaped copulatory openings.

The spider is almost indistinguishable from other members of the genus, which can make recognition challenging. The male is almost identical to Stenaelurillus bandama and initially the holotype of that species was thought to be Stenaelurillus hirsutus. It is distinguishable by its narrower embolus.  The shape of the embolus is also an important difference between this species and Stenaelurillus jocquei. The female is almost identical to Stenaelurillus pilosus, but can be identified by the elongated shape of the spermathecae. The spider is also very similar to Stenaelurillus glaber and  Stenaelurillus striolatus.  However, it can be distinguished from these species by the pattern on the clypeus, which is black with three vertical white stripes.

Distribution and habitat
The species was first identified near Faradje, Democratic Republic of the Congo. It was then found across East Africa, including around Lake Baringo in the Kenyan Rift Valley, the Mkomazi National Park in Tanzania and Murchison Falls National Park In Uganda. It has also been found near Bambari, Central African Republic, in the West Gonja Municipal District of Ghana, Kossou in Ivory Coast and Bignona in Senegal. The species distribution encompasses Central Africa, Congo, Ghana,  Kenya, Senegal, Tanzania, and Uganda. The species seems to favour hot, dry areas, finding shelter amongst shrubs.

References

Citations

Bibliography

Fauna of Central Africa
Fauna of the Democratic Republic of the Congo
Fauna of Ghana
Fauna of Ivory Coast
Fauna of Senegal
Fauna of Tanzania
Salticidae
Spiders described in 1927
Spiders of Africa